The Wise Guys (U.S. video title: Jailbirds' Vacation) is a 1965 French drama film directed by Robert Enrico, based on a novel by José Giovanni. Featuring two popular male leads in Bourvil and Lino Ventura, it tells the story of a man struggling to get his ancient family sawmill back into production, despite violent opposition from competitors and betrayal by his right-hand man.

It was the eighth most popular film at the French box office in 1965.

Plot
When his father dies, Hector returns after 20 years in Canada to the Vosges mountains in order to take over the family sawmill. Remote and antiquated, it cannot compete with modern concerns and nobody wants to work there. At an auction, he runs into two ex-convicts, Laurent and Mick, who are looking for a job. Laurent persuades Hector to recruit a group of parolees from the local prison.

At first, the arrangement works well. With a labour force who are paid little and cannot leave, he is able to get the sawmill into production again. This incurs the wrath of Therraz, owner of a timber business further down the valley who does not want a competitor with lower costs, and battles ensue between rival groups of woodcutters.

One parolee, called Reichmann, was held back and eventually Hector is told that he will be arriving by bus the day after the village fête. The workers are enjoying the fête until a group of Therraz's men break it up in an epic battle. When the police arrive, Mick is found dead. Next morning, when Hector goes to pick up Reichmann, the man is not there.

Returning to the sawmill, he finds the police taking all the parolees back to jail and learns that Laurent's motive for hiring them was to get Reichmann into a lonely place where he could kill him. In despair at the treachery, and the failure of his dream, Hector decides to burn down the sawmill and die in the flames. Laurent, who was heading off for Italy, repents and rushes back to the mill, just in time to save him.

Cast 
 Bourvil as Hector Valentin
 Lino Ventura as Laurent
  as Mick
 Jess Hahn as Nénesse
 Marie Dubois as Jackie
 Michel Constantin as Skida
 Nick Stephanini as Therraz
 Paul Crauchet as Pelissier

References

External links 

1965 films
Films based on works by José Giovanni
Films directed by Robert Enrico
Films scored by François de Roubaix
French drama films
Italian drama films
Films with screenplays by José Giovanni
Films set in forests
1960s Italian films
1960s French films